GMAT can stand for

Tan Tan Airport - ICAO code for Moroccan airport
Graduate Management Admission Test
General Mission Analysis Tool, an open source astrodynamics computer program developed by NASA
 Greenwich Mean Astronomical Time - see Greenwich Mean Time